The 2017 Graz local election was held on 5 February 2017 to elect the members of the Gemeindesrat of Graz.

The Austrian People's Party (ÖVP) were the clear winners of the election, remaining the largest party with 38% of the vote. The Communist Party of Austria (KPÖ) remained the second largest party with 20%, while the Freedom Party of Austria (FPÖ) rose to third place. The Social Democratic Party of Austria (SPÖ) and The Greens both suffered losses. NEOS – The New Austria contested their first election in Graz, winning 4% and won one seat.

Incumbent Mayor Siegfried Nagl of the ÖVP was re-elected, while Elke Kahr of the KPÖ remained deputy mayor.

Background
The Styrian constitution mandates that positions in municipal government (city councillors) be allocated between parties proportionally in accordance with the share of votes won by each; this is known as Proporz. As such, the government of Graz is a perpetual coalition of all parties that qualify for at least one city councillor.

In the 2012 election, the KPÖ became the second largest party in Graz with 20%. The ÖVP, SPÖ, and Greens all suffered losses, while the FPÖ and Pirate Party made gains. The city government was dominated by the ÖVP with three councillors, while the KPÖ, SPÖ, FPÖ, and Greens won one councillor each.

Electoral system
The 48 seats of the Gemeindesrat of Graz are elected via open list proportional representation with no electoral threshold.

Contesting parties

In addition to the parties already represented in the Gemeindesrat, four parties collected enough signatures to be placed on the ballot:

 NEOS – The New Austria (NEOS)
 List WIR – Independent Citizens List Graz (WIR)
 Einsparkraftwerk (ESK)
 Tatjana Petrovic

Results

Results by district

References

2017 elections in Austria
Graz
Local elections in Austria
February 2017 events in Europe